Piazza Armerina Cathedral is a Roman Catholic cathedral located in Piazza Armerina, Sicily, Italy. The dedication is to Mary of the Victories (Maria Santissima delle Vittorie). It is the seat of the  Bishops of Piazza Armerina.

Built on the foundations of an earlier church of the 15th century and based on a design by architect Orazio Torriani, its construction began in 1604 and ended in 1719, while the dome was added in 1768. It became the seat of the Diocese of Piazza (later Piazza Armerina) when it was created in 1817.

The interior of the cathedral is dominated by the central dome. It contains a cross painted on both sides, showing the crucifixion and resurrection of Christ, and a baptistery by Antonello Gagini.

References

External links 

 Catholic Hierarchy: Diocese of Piazza Armerina

Churches in the province of Enna
Roman Catholic churches completed in 1719
Roman Catholic churches completed in 1768
Roman Catholic cathedrals in Italy
Cathedrals in Sicily
1719 establishments in Italy
18th-century Roman Catholic church buildings in Italy